Dianne Kahura (born 1 May 1969) is a former rugby union player for the Black Ferns. She played in the 1998 and 2002 Women's Rugby World Cup.

Kahura was a member of the first official New Zealand women's sevens team, who took part in the 2000 Hong Kong Sevens. She was also in the squad that won the 2001 Hong Kong Sevens.

References

1969 births
Living people
New Zealand women's international rugby union players
New Zealand female rugby union players
Female rugby sevens players
New Zealand women's international rugby sevens players